Sympistis cottami is a species of moth in the family Noctuidae (the owlet moths).

The MONA or Hodges number for Sympistis cottami is 10129.

References

Further reading

 
 
 

cottami
Articles created by Qbugbot
Moths described in 1972